Jean-Claude Dague, born Jean-Claude Dagouassat in 1937, is a French film director.

Biography 
After having directed four films, Jean-Claude Dague's production company was almost bankrupt. He then attempted a hold-up in Bry-sur-Marne in 1971, but was easily caught with his two partners, having used his own car to flee. The two partners were actor René Chapotot and stuntman Germain Roig. Dague then spent eight years in prison, and wrote about it in a book, Le Dénommé, of which he made a film in 1990.

Filmography 
Director
 1968 : Le Bal des voyous
 1969 : Poussez pas grand-père dans les cactus
 1970 : Désirella
 1971 : L'Homme qui vient de la nuit
 1990 : Le Dénommé
 1999 : La Paix pour les Enfants du Monde

Actor
 1966 : Espions à l'affût

Screenwriter
 1991 : La Dernière Saison

References

External links
 

1937 births
French film directors
Living people
People convicted of robbery